Alireza Ramezani (born September 1, 1984) is an Iranian footballer who plays for Malavan in the Persian Gulf Pro League.

Club career statistics

References

External links
 Alireza Ramezani player profile from iranproleague.net

1984 births
Living people
Persian Gulf Pro League players
Azadegan League players
Malavan players
Shahrdari Bandar Abbas players
Sanat Sari players
Iranian footballers
Association football wingers
Association football fullbacks